Matt Desrosiers is the current head coach of the Clarkson Golden Knight's women's ice hockey team. He has served in that capacity since the 2008–09 season. From 2008 until 2014, he served as co–head coach with his wife, Shannon Desroisers.

Tournament History
He has won three NCAA Championships in 2014, 2017 and 2018.  He has appeared in three NCAA Frozen Fours.  Desrosiers has appeared in seven tournaments with an NCAA Tournament record of 10–4.

2009–10: 
 Quarterfinals: Clarkson 2 vs. Minnesota 3 (OT)
2012–13
 Quarterfinals: Clarkson 3 vs. Boston University 5
2013–14
 Quarterfinals: Clarkson 3 vs. Boston College 1
 Frozen Four: Clarkson 5 vs. Mercyhurst 1
 Championship: Clarkson 5 vs. Minnesota 4
2014–15
 Quarterfinals: Clarkson 1 vs. Boston College 5
2015–16
 Quarterfinals: Clarkson 1 vs. Quinnipiac 0
 Frozen Four: Clarkson 2 vs. Boston College 3 (OT)
2016–17
 Quarterfinals: Clarkson 3 vs. Cornell 1
 Frozen Four: Clarkson 4 vs. Minnesota 3
 Championship: Clarkson 3 vs. Wisconsin 0
2017-18
 Quarterfinals: Clarkson 2 vs. Mercyhurst 1
 Frozen Four: Clarkson 1 vs. Ohio State 0 (OT)
 Championship: Clarkson 2 vs. Colgate 1 (OT)

2018-19

 Quarterfinals: Clarkson 2 vs. Boston College 1
 Frozen Four: Clarkson 0 vs. Wisconsin 5

Coaching Record

See also
List of college women's ice hockey coaches with 250 wins

References

1979 births
Living people
Canadian ice hockey coaches
Ice hockey people from Ontario
People from Fort Erie, Ontario
AHCA Division I men's ice hockey All-Americans
St. Lawrence Saints men's ice hockey players
Dayton Bombers players
South Carolina Stingrays players
Colorado Eagles players